Han Sung-hee (born 13 November 1990 in Seoul) is a South Korean former tennis player.

On 16 July 2012, she reached her highest WTA singles ranking of 256. On 16 April 2012, she peaked at No. 268 in the doubles rankings. She participated in the 2013 KDB Korea Open, losing in the first round to Alexandra Dulgheru.

ITF Circuit finals

Singles: 6 (1 title, 5 runner-ups)

Doubles: 18 (7 titles, 11 runner-ups)

External links
 
 

1990 births
Living people
Tennis players from Seoul
South Korean female tennis players
21st-century South Korean women